{{DISPLAYTITLE:C12H8Cl6O}}
The molecular formula C12H8Cl6O (molar mass: 380.91 g/mol, exact mass: 377.8706 u) may refer to:

Dieldrin
Endrin